Dasso may refer to:

Dasso, Benin, an arrondissement in Ouinhi, Benin

People with the surname Dasso
Andrés F. Dasso (1893–after 1930), Peruvian politician, mayor of Lima 1922–25
Frank Dasso (1917-2009), American baseball player
Mary Dasso, American biochemist
Naldo Dasso (born 1931), Argentine equestrian
Willy Dasso (born 1917), Peruvian Olympic basketball player

See also
 Dassault, a France-based group of companies
 Dassow, a town in Mecklenburg-Western Pomerania, Germany
Akatsuki no Dassō, Japanese film
KJ2 Zukkoke Dai Dassō, album by the Japanese band Kanjani Eight